Regina Asamany (born 30 July 1927) was a Ghanaian politician who hailed from Kpando, a town in the Volta Region of Ghana. She is widely recognised as one of the women whose efforts helped Ghana attain independence. She was the daughter of an ivory carver and the only woman to make it into the first rank of the Togoland Congress leadership in the 1950s. She was a member of parliament representing the Volta Region from 1960 to 1965 and the member of parliament for Kpando from 1965 to 1966.

Biography
Asamany was born on 30 July 1927 at Kpando in the Volta Region. She had her early education at Kpando Presbyterian School from 1935 to 1940 and later moved to Kumasi Government Girls' School from 1941 to 1944.

Asamany was among the first women to enter the parliament of Ghana in 1960 under the representation of the people (women members) act. She was among the 10 women who were elected unopposed on 27 June 1960 on the ticket Convention People's Party. While in parliament, she served as the deputy Minister of Labour and Social Welfare from 1961 to 1963. Prior to entering parliament, she worked at the Ministry of Labour and Social Welfare as mass education assistant. She was an Executive Member of National Council of Ghana Women, Trustee of the Kwame Nkrumah Trust Fund and the Chairman of the Visiting Committee of Borstal Institutes.

In 1979, she founded the Mother Ghana Solidarity Party with the intention to contest for presidency in the 1979 general elections but was unable to contest as she missed the registration deadline by a few minutes because the cheque for the registration fee had delayed.

Her hobbies were gardening, playing lawn tennis, dancing and photography.

See also
 List of MPs elected in the 1965 Ghanaian parliamentary election

References

1927 births
Ghanaian MPs 1956–1965
Ghanaian MPs 1965–1966
Convention People's Party (Ghana) politicians
20th-century Ghanaian women politicians
Possibly living people